Samuel Parrilla Monges (June 12, 1943 – February 9, 1994) was a Puerto Rican professional baseball left fielder and pinch hitter, who played in Major League Baseball (MLB) for the Philadelphia Phillies, in . In 1994 he was shot and killed by a 15-year old following an auto accident.

One of his daughters is actress Lana Parrilla, the star of the ABC fairy tale drama series Once Upon a Time.

Minor league career
Parrilla was originally signed by the Cleveland Indians as an undrafted free agent in 1963 after graduating from John Jay Educational Campus (Brooklyn) in 1961. He spent ten seasons in the minor leagues, until 1972, hitting .282 with 104 home runs, 165 doubles and 36 triples in 1,039 games.

Perhaps his best season was 1969, when he hit .383 with 28 home runs and 85 RBI (all career highs) in 95 games for the Raleigh-Durham Phillies. That was the first of three consecutive seasons in which he would hit .330 or better.

He played in the Indians, New York Yankees, Phillies and Baltimore Orioles systems.

Major league career
Parrilla was signed by the Philadelphia Phillies before the 1969 season.

He made his major league debut on April 11, 1970 and played his final big league game on May 11 of that year. In 11 games, he collected two hits in 16 at-bats for a .125 batting average. On May 3, he collected his first hit against San Francisco Giants pitcher Mike McCormick and on May 8, he collected his second hit - a double - off of Los Angeles Dodgers pitcher Claude Osteen.

He was traded along with Grant Jackson and Jim Hutto from the Phillies to the Orioles for Roger Freed on December 15, 1970.

References

External links

Sam Parrilla at SABR (Baseball BioProject)
Sam Parrilla at Baseball Almanac
Sam Parrilla at Baseball Gauge

1943 births
1994 deaths
Burlington Indians players (1958–1964)
Deaths by firearm in Brooklyn
Dorados de Chihuahua players
Dubuque Packers players
Eugene Emeralds players
Major League Baseball left fielders
Major League Baseball players from Puerto Rico
Male murder victims
Pawtucket Indians players
People from Santurce, Puerto Rico
People murdered in New York City
Portland Beavers players
Puerto Rican expatriate baseball players in Mexico
Philadelphia Phillies players
Raleigh-Durham Phillies players
Reading Indians players
Rochester Red Wings players
Salinas Indians players
Syracuse Chiefs players
Waterbury Indians players